Pogopus is a monotypic moth genus of the family Erebidae. Its only species, Pogopus mictochroma, is known from Panama. Both the genus and the species were first described by Harrison Gray Dyar Jr. in 1914.

References

External links
Original description: Proceedings of the United States National Museum :217

Herminiinae
Monotypic moth genera